In mathematics, a self-adjoint operator on an infinite-dimensional complex vector space V with inner product  (equivalently, a Hermitian operator in the finite-dimensional case) is a linear map A (from V to itself) that is its own adjoint. If V is finite-dimensional with a given orthonormal basis, this is equivalent to the condition that the matrix of A is a Hermitian matrix, i.e., equal to its conjugate transpose A. By the finite-dimensional spectral theorem, V has an orthonormal basis such that the matrix of A relative to this basis is a diagonal matrix with entries in the real numbers. In this article, we consider generalizations of this concept to operators on Hilbert spaces of arbitrary dimension.

Self-adjoint operators are used in functional analysis and quantum mechanics.  In quantum mechanics their importance lies in the Dirac–von Neumann formulation of quantum mechanics, in which physical observables such as position, momentum, angular momentum and spin are represented by self-adjoint operators on a Hilbert space. Of particular significance is the Hamiltonian operator  defined by

which as an observable corresponds to the total energy of a particle of mass m in a real potential field V. Differential operators are an important class of unbounded operators.

The structure of self-adjoint operators on infinite-dimensional Hilbert spaces essentially resembles the finite-dimensional case. That is to say, operators are self-adjoint if and only if they are unitarily equivalent to real-valued multiplication operators. With suitable modifications, this result can be extended to possibly unbounded operators on infinite-dimensional spaces. Since an everywhere-defined self-adjoint operator is necessarily bounded, one needs be more attentive to the domain issue in the unbounded case. This is explained below in more detail.

Definitions 
Let  be an unbounded (i.e. not necessarily bounded) operator with a dense domain   This condition holds automatically when  is finite-dimensional since  for every linear operator on a finite-dimensional space.

Let the inner product  be conjugate-linear on the second argument. This applies to complex Hilbert spaces only. By definition, the adjoint operator  acts on the subspace  consisting of the elements  for which there is a  such that  for every  Setting  defines the linear operator 

The graph of an (arbitrary) operator  is the set  An operator  is said to extend  if  This is written as 

The densely defined operator  is called symmetric if

 

for all  As shown below,  is symmetric if and only if 

The unbounded densely defined operator  is called self-adjoint if  Explicitly,  and  Every self-adjoint operator is symmetric. In physics, the term Hermitian refers to symmetric as well as self-adjoint operators alike. The subtle difference between the two is generally overlooked.

A subset  is called the resolvent set (or regular set) if for every  the (not-necessarily-bounded) operator  has a bounded everywhere-defined inverse. The complement  is called spectrum. In finite dimensions,  consists exclusively of eigenvalues.

Bounded self-adjoint operators
A bounded operator A is self-adjoint if 

Every bounded linear operator T : H → H on a Hilbert space H can be written in the form  where A : H → H and B : H → H are bounded self-adjoint operators.

Properties of bounded self-adjoint operators 

  is real for all .
  if  
 The eigenvalues of A are real and eigenvectors belonging to different eigenvalues are orthogonal. 
 If  is an eigenvalue of A then ; in particular, . 
 If a sequence of bounded self-adjoint linear operators is convergent then the limit is self-adjoint.

Symmetric operators 

NOTE: symmetric operators are defined above.

A is symmetric ⇔ A⊆A
An unbounded, densely defined operator  is symmetric if and only if  Indeed, the if-part follows directly from the definition of the adjoint operator. For the only-if-part, assuming that  is symmetric, the inclusion  follows from
the Cauchy–Bunyakovsky–Schwarz inequality: for every 

The equality  holds due to the equality

The Hellinger–Toeplitz theorem says that an everywhere-defined symmetric operator is bounded and self-adjoint.

A is symmetric ⇔ ∀x ⟨Ax, x⟩ ∈ R 
The only-if part follows directly from the definition (see above). To prove the if-part, assume without loss of generality that the inner product  is anti-linear on the first argument and linear on the second. (In the reverse scenario, we work with  instead). The symmetry of  follows from the polarization identity

which holds for every

||(A−λ)x|| ≥ d(λ)⋅||x|| 
This property is used in the proof that the spectrum of a self-adjoint operator is real.

Define   and  The values  are properly defined since  and  due to symmetry. Then, for every  and every 

where 

Indeed, let  By Cauchy-Schwarz inequality,

A simple example

As noted above, the spectral theorem applies only to self-adjoint operators, and not in general to symmetric operators. Nevertheless, we can at this point give a simple example of a symmetric operator that has an orthonormal basis of eigenvectors. The same can then be said for A.

Consider the complex Hilbert space L2[0,1] and the differential operator
 

with  consisting of all complex-valued infinitely differentiable functions f on [0, 1]  satisfying the boundary conditions 

Then integration by parts of the inner product shows that A is symmetric. The reader is invited to perform integration by parts twice and verify that the given boundary conditions for  ensure that the boundary terms in the integration by parts vanish.

The eigenfunctions of A are the sinusoids
 

with the real eigenvalues n2π2; the well-known orthogonality of the sine functions follows as a consequence of the property of being symmetric.

We consider generalizations of this operator below.

Spectrum of self-adjoint operators 
Let  be an unbounded symmetric operator.  is self-adjoint if and only if

Essential self-adjointness
A symmetric operator A is always closable; that is, the closure of the graph of A is the graph of an operator. A symmetric operator A is said to be essentially self-adjoint if the closure of A is self-adjoint. Equivalently, A is essentially self-adjoint if it has a unique self-adjoint extension. In practical terms, having an essentially self-adjoint operator is almost as good as having a self-adjoint operator, since we merely need to take the closure to obtain self-adjoint operator.

Example: f(x) → x·f(x)
Consider the complex Hilbert space L2(R), and the operator which multiplies a given function by x:

Then A is self-adjoint. On the other hand, A does not have any eigenfunctions. (More precisely, A does not have any normalizable eigenvectors, that is, eigenvectors that are actually in the Hilbert space on which A is defined.)

As we will see later, self-adjoint operators have very important spectral properties; they are in fact multiplication operators on general measure spaces.

Symmetric vs self-adjoint operators
As has been discussed above, although the distinction between a symmetric operator and a self-adjoint (or essentially self-adjoint) operator is a subtle one, it is important since self-adjointness is the hypothesis in the spectral theorem. Here we discuss some concrete examples of the distinction; see the section below on extensions of symmetric operators for the general theory.

A note regarding domains

Every self-adjoint operator is symmetric.

Boundary conditions
In the case where the Hilbert space is a space of functions on a bounded domain, these distinctions have to do with a familiar issue in quantum physics: One cannot define an operator—such as the momentum or Hamiltonian operator—on a bounded domain without specifying boundary conditions. In mathematical terms, choosing the boundary conditions amounts to choosing an appropriate domain for the operator. Consider, for example, the Hilbert space  (the space of square-integrable functions on the interval [0,1]). Let us define a "momentum" operator A on this space by the usual formula, setting Planck's constant equal to 1:
 

We must now specify a domain for A, which amounts to choosing boundary conditions. If we choose
 

then A is not symmetric (because the boundary terms in the integration by parts do not vanish).

If we choose 
 

then using integration by parts, one can easily verify that A is symmetric. This operator is not essentially self-adjoint, however, basically because we have specified too many boundary conditions on the domain of A, which makes the domain of the adjoint too big. (This example is discussed also in the "Examples" section below.)

Specifically, with the above choice of domain for A, the domain of the closure  of A is

whereas the domain of the adjoint  of A is

That is to say, the domain of the closure has the same boundary conditions as the domain of A itself, just a less stringent smoothness assumption.

Since the domain of the closure and the domain of the adjoint do not agree, A is not essentially self-adjoint.

The problem with the preceding example is that we imposed too many boundary conditions on the domain of A. A better choice of domain would be to use periodic boundary conditions:

With this domain, A is essentially self-adjoint.

In this case, we can understand the implications of the domain issues for the spectral theorem. If we use the second choice of domain (with Dirichlet boundary conditions), A has no eigenvectors at all. If we use the third choice of domain (with periodic boundary conditions), we can find an orthonormal basis of eigenvectors for A, the functions . Thus, in this case finding a domain such that A is self-adjoint is a compromise: the domain has to be small enough so that A is symmetric, but large enough so that .

Schrödinger operators with singular potentials
A more subtle example of the distinction between symmetric and (essentially) self-adjoint operators comes from Schrödinger operators in quantum mechanics. If the potential energy is singular—particularly if the potential is unbounded below—the associated Schrödinger operator may fail to be essentially self-adjoint. In one dimension, for example, the operator

is not essentially self-adjoint on the space of smooth, rapidly decaying functions. In this case, the failure of essential self-adjointness reflects a pathology in the underlying classical system: A classical particle with a  potential escapes to infinity in finite time. This operator does not have a unique self-adjoint, but it does admit self-adjoint extensions obtained by specifying "boundary conditions at infinity". (Since  is a real operator, it commutes with complex conjugation. Thus, the deficiency indices are automatically equal, which is the condition for having a self-adjoint extension. See the discussion of extensions of symmetric operators below.)

In this case, if we initially define  on the space of smooth, rapidly decaying functions, the adjoint will be "the same" operator (i.e., given by the same formula) but on the largest possible domain, namely

It is then possible to show that  is not a symmetric operator, which certainly implies that  is not essentially self-adjoint. Indeed,  has eigenvectors with pure imaginary eigenvalues, which is impossible for a symmetric operator. This sort of cancellation does not occur if we replace the repelling potential  with the confining potential .

Conditions for Schrödinger operators to be self-adjoint or essentially self-adjoint can be found in various textbooks, such as those by Berezin and Shubin, Hall, and Reed and Simon listed in the references.

Spectral theorem 

In the physics literature, the spectral theorem is often stated by saying that a self-adjoint operator has an orthonormal basis of eigenvectors. Physicists are well aware, however, of the phenomenon of "continuous spectrum"; thus, when they speak of an "orthonormal basis" they mean either an orthonormal basis in the classic sense or some continuous analog thereof. In the case of the momentum operator , for example, physicists would say that the eigenvectors are the functions , which are clearly not in the Hilbert space . (Physicists would say that the eigenvectors are "non-normalizable.") Physicists would then go on to say that these "eigenvectors" are orthonormal in a continuous sense, where the usual Kronecker delta  is replaced by a Dirac delta function .

The spectral theorem in general can be expressed similarly as the possibility of "diagonalizing" an operator by showing it is unitarily equivalent to a multiplication operator. Other versions of the spectral theorem are similarly intended to capture the idea that a self-adjoint operator can have "eigenvectors" that are not actually in the Hilbert space in question.

Statement of the spectral theorem

Partially defined operators A, B on Hilbert spaces H, K are unitarily equivalent if and only if there is a unitary transformation U : H → K such that

 U maps dom A bijectively onto  dom B,
 

A multiplication operator is defined as follows:  Let (X, Σ, μ) be a countably additive measure space and f a real-valued measurable function on X. An operator  of the form

whose domain is the space of ψ for which the right-hand side above is in L2 is called a multiplication operator.

One version of the spectral theorem can be stated as follows.

Other versions of the spectral theorem can be found in the spectral theorem article linked to above.

The spectral theorem for unbounded self-adjoint operators can be proved by reduction to the spectral theorem for unitary (hence bounded) operators.  This reduction uses the Cayley transform for self-adjoint operators which is defined in the next section. We might note that if T is multiplication by f, then the spectrum of T is just the essential range of f.

Functional calculus 
One important application of the spectral theorem is to define a "functional calculus." If  has a true orthonormal basis of eigenvectors  with eigenvalues , then  is the operator with eigenvectors  and eigenvalues . The goal of functional calculus is to extend this idea to the case where  has continuous spectrum.

In this case, the functional calculus should allow us to define the operator

which is the operator defining the time-evolution in quantum mechanics.

Given the representation of T as the operator of multiplication by —as guaranteed by the spectral theorem—it is easy to characterize the functional calculus:  If h is a bounded real-valued Borel function on R, then h(T) is the operator of multiplication by the composition .

Resolution of the identity 
It has been customary to introduce the following notation

where  is the characteristic function (indicator function)of the interval .  The family of projection operators ET(λ) is called resolution of the identity for T.  Moreover, the following Stieltjes integral representation for T can be proved:

The definition of the operator integral above can be reduced to that of a scalar valued Stieltjes integral using the weak operator topology. In more modern treatments however, this representation is usually avoided, since most technical problems can be dealt with by the functional calculus.

Formulation in the physics literature 
In physics, particularly in quantum mechanics, the spectral theorem is expressed in a way which combines the spectral theorem as stated above and the Borel functional calculus using Dirac notation as follows:

If H is self-adjoint and f is a Borel function,

with

where the integral runs over the whole spectrum of H. The notation suggests that H is diagonalized by the eigenvectors ΨE. Such a notation is purely formal. One can see the similarity between Dirac's notation and the previous section. The resolution of the identity (sometimes called projection valued measures) formally resembles the rank-1 projections . In the Dirac notation, (projective) measurements are described via eigenvalues and eigenstates, both purely formal objects. As one would expect, this does not survive passage to the resolution of the identity. Alternatively, if one would like to preserve the notion of eigenstates and make it rigorous, rather than merely formal, one can replace the state space by a suitable rigged Hilbert space.

If , the theorem is referred to as resolution of unity:

In the case  is the sum of an Hermitian H and a skew-Hermitian  (see skew-Hermitian matrix) operator , one defines the biorthogonal basis set

and write the spectral theorem as:

(See Feshbach–Fano partitioning method for the context where such operators appear in scattering theory).

Extensions of symmetric operators 

The following question arises in several contexts: if an operator A on the Hilbert space H is symmetric, when does it have self-adjoint extensions?  An operator that has a unique self-adjoint extension is said to be essentially self-adjoint; equivalently, an operator is essentially self-adjoint if its closure (the operator whose graph is the closure of the graph of A) is self-adjoint. In general, a symmetric operator could have many self-adjoint extensions or none at all. Thus, we would like a classification of its self-adjoint extensions.

The first basic criterion for essential self-adjointness is the following:

Equivalently, A is essentially self-adjoint if and only if the operators  and  have trivial kernels.

Another way of looking at the issue is provided by the Cayley transform of a self-adjoint operator and the deficiency indices. (It is often of technical convenience to deal with closed operators. In the symmetric case, the closedness requirement poses no obstacles, since it is known that all symmetric operators are closable.)

Here, ran and dom denote the image (in other words, range) and the domain, respectively. W(A) is isometric on its domain.  Moreover, the range of 1 − W(A) is dense in H.

Conversely, given any partially defined operator U which is isometric on its domain (which is not necessarily closed) and such that 1 − U is dense, there is a (unique) operator S(U)
 

such that
 

The operator S(U)  is densely defined and symmetric.

The mappings W and S are inverses of each other.

The mapping W is called the Cayley transform.  It associates a partially defined isometry to any symmetric densely defined operator.  Note that the mappings W and S are monotone: This means that if B is a symmetric operator that extends the densely defined symmetric operator A, then W(B) extends W(A), and similarly for S.

This immediately gives us a necessary and sufficient condition for A to have a self-adjoint extension, as follows:

A partially defined isometric operator V on a Hilbert space H has a unique isometric extension to the norm closure of dom(V). A partially defined isometric operator with closed domain is called a partial isometry.

Given a partial isometry V, the deficiency indices of V are defined as the dimension of the orthogonal complements of the domain and range:

We see that there is a bijection between symmetric extensions of an operator and isometric extensions of its Cayley transform. The symmetric extension is self-adjoint if and only if the corresponding isometric extension is unitary.

A symmetric operator has a unique self-adjoint extension if and only if both its deficiency indices are zero.  Such an operator is said to be essentially self-adjoint. Symmetric operators which are not essentially self-adjoint may still have a canonical self-adjoint extension.  Such is the case for non-negative symmetric operators (or more generally, operators which are bounded below).  These operators always have a canonically defined Friedrichs extension and for these operators we can define a canonical functional calculus. Many operators that occur in  analysis are bounded below (such as the negative of the Laplacian operator), so the issue of essential adjointness for these operators is less critical.

Self-adjoint extensions in quantum mechanics
In quantum mechanics, observables correspond to self-adjoint operators. By Stone's theorem on one-parameter unitary groups, self-adjoint operators are precisely the infinitesimal generators of unitary groups of time evolution operators. However, many physical problems are formulated as a time-evolution equation involving differential operators for which the Hamiltonian is only symmetric.  In such cases, either the Hamiltonian is essentially self-adjoint, in which case the physical problem has unique solutions or one attempts to find self-adjoint extensions of the Hamiltonian corresponding to different types of boundary conditions or conditions at infinity.

Example. See Berezin and Schubin, pages 55 and 86, or Section 9.10 in Hall.

The failure of essential self-adjointness for  has a counterpart in the classical dynamics of a particle with potential : The classical particle escapes to infinity in finite time.

Example. There is no self-adjoint momentum operator p for a particle moving on a half-line. Nevertheless, the Hamiltonian  of a "free" particle on a half-line has several self-adjoint extensions corresponding to different types of boundary conditions. Physically, these boundary conditions are related to reflections of the particle at the origin (see Reed and Simon, vol.2).

Von Neumann's formulas 
Suppose A is symmetric densely defined. Then any symmetric extension of A is a restriction of A*.  Indeed, A ⊆ B and B symmetric yields B ⊆ A* by applying the definition of dom(A*).

These are referred to as von Neumann's formulas in the Akhiezer and Glazman reference.

Examples

A symmetric operator that is not essentially self-adjoint
We first consider the Hilbert space  and the differential operator

 

defined on the space of continuously differentiable complex-valued functions on [0,1], satisfying the boundary conditions

Then D is a symmetric operator as can be shown by integration by parts.  The spaces N+, N− (defined below) are given respectively by the distributional solutions to the equation

which are in L2[0, 1].  One can show that each one of these solution spaces is 1-dimensional, generated by the functions x → e−x and x → ex respectively.  This shows that D is not essentially self-adjoint, but does have self-adjoint extensions.  These self-adjoint extensions are parametrized by the space of unitary mappings N+ → N−, which in this case happens to be the unit circle T.

Since  is a first-order operator, only one boundary condition is needed to ensure that  is symmetric. If we replaced the boundary conditions given above by the single boundary condition
 ,

then D would still be symmetric and would now, in fact, be essentially self-adjoint. This change of boundary conditions gives one particular essentially self-adjoint extension of D. Other essentially self-adjoint extensions come from imposing boundary conditions of the form .

This simple example illustrates a general fact about self-adjoint extensions of symmetric differential operators P on an open set M. They are determined by the unitary maps between the eigenvalue spaces          
 

where Pdist is the distributional extension of P.

Constant-coefficient operators
We next give the example of differential operators with constant coefficients. Let

be a polynomial on Rn with real coefficients, where α ranges over a (finite) set of multi-indices.  Thus
 

and
 

We also use the notation

Then the operator P(D) defined on the space of infinitely differentiable functions of compact support on Rn by
 

is essentially self-adjoint on L2(Rn).

More generally, consider linear differential operators acting on infinitely differentiable complex-valued functions of compact support.  If M is an open subset of Rn

where aα are (not necessarily constant) infinitely differentiable functions. P is a linear operator

Corresponding to P there is another differential operator, the formal adjoint of P

Spectral multiplicity theory 
The multiplication representation of a self-adjoint operator, though extremely useful, is not a canonical representation.  This suggests that it is not easy to extract from this representation a criterion to determine when self-adjoint operators A and B are unitarily equivalent.   The finest grained representation which we now discuss involves spectral multiplicity.  This circle of results is called the Hahn–Hellinger theory of spectral multiplicity.

Uniform multiplicity
We first define uniform multiplicity:

Definition. A self-adjoint operator A has uniform multiplicity n where n is such that 1 ≤ n ≤ ω if and only if A is unitarily equivalent  to the operator Mf of multiplication by the function f(λ) = λ on
 

where Hn is a Hilbert space of dimension n.  The domain of Mf consists of vector-valued functions ψ on R such that
 

Non-negative countably additive measures μ, ν are mutually singular if and only if they are supported on disjoint Borel sets.

This representation is unique in the following sense: For any two such representations of the same A, the corresponding measures are equivalent in the sense that they have the same sets of measure 0.

Direct integrals
The spectral multiplicity theorem can be reformulated using the language of direct integrals of Hilbert spaces:

Unlike the multiplication-operator version of the spectral theorem, the direct-integral version is unique in the sense that the measure equivalence class of μ (or equivalently its sets of measure 0) is uniquely determined and the measurable function  is determined almost everywhere with respect to μ. The function  is the spectral multiplicity function of the operator.

We may now state the classification result for self-adjoint operators: Two self-adjoint operators are unitarily equivalent if and only if (1) their spectra agree as sets, (2) the measures appearing in their direct-integral representations have the same sets of measure zero, and (3) their spectral multiplicity functions agree almost everywhere with respect to the measure in the direct integral.

Example: structure of the Laplacian 
The Laplacian on Rn is the operator

As remarked above, the Laplacian is diagonalized by the Fourier transform.  Actually it is more natural to consider the negative of the Laplacian −Δ since as an operator it is non-negative; (see elliptic operator).

Pure point spectrum 
A self-adjoint operator A on H has pure point spectrum if and only if H has an orthonormal basis {ei}i ∈ I consisting of eigenvectors for A.

Example.  The Hamiltonian for the harmonic oscillator has a quadratic potential V, that is

This Hamiltonian has pure point spectrum; this is typical for bound state Hamiltonians in quantum mechanics. As was pointed out in a previous example, a sufficient condition that an unbounded symmetric operator has eigenvectors which form a Hilbert space basis is that it has a compact inverse.

See also 
Compact operator on Hilbert space
Theoretical and experimental justification for the Schrödinger equation
Unbounded operator
Hermitian adjoint
Positive operator
Non-Hermitian quantum mechanics

Citations

References

 
 
 
 
  
 
 
 
  
 
  
 
  
 

Hilbert space
Operator theory
Linear operators